Walter Blackman (born 1965/1966) is an American politician who served as a member of the Arizona House of Representatives from the 6th district. He was the first Black Republican elected to the Arizona State Legislature. Blackman served 21 years in the United States Army, earning a Bronze Star for combat action as a tank commander in Iraq.

Early life and education
Blackman was born on an Army base in Portugal, where his father served as an officer in the United States Air Force Security Forces. He was raised in Wiesbaden, Germany.

Career 
Blackman served in the United States Army for 21 years as a front line tank commander, and a sexual harassment and assault prevention Senior Program Manager specialist. He earned a Bronze Star for combat action in Iraq, and a Meritorious Service Medal. From 2016 to 2018, he was the founder, President, and Chief Executive Officer of WB Inclusion and Diversity Consulting Firm, LLC in Snowflake, Arizona.

Political career
Blackman was elected in 2018 to succeed term-limited Arizona State Representative Brenda Barton as a Republican member of the Arizona House of Representatives representing district 6. He is the first Black Republican elected to the Arizona Legislature.

He supports criminal justice reform. He is chair of the Ad Hoc Committee on Earned Release Credits for Prisoners, Vice Chair of the Judiciary Committee, Vice Chair of the State and International Affairs Committee, and a Member of the Education Commission of the States, Government Committee, and Regulatory Affairs Committee. In February 2020, the Arizona House unanimously approved a bill he proposed that would give all non-violent offense state prisoners time off their sentences if they work in prison, or take drug treatment or major self-improvement courses in prison.

Commenting on the murder of George Floyd and also highlighting Floyd's criminal record, Blackman said on Facebook: "I DO NOT support George Floyd and I refuse to see him as a martyr. But I hope his family receives justice." Blackman also called the Black Lives Matter movement a "terrorist organization", likened it to the Ku Klux Klan and questioned whether police brutality existed. In reaction, the Arizona branches of the American Friends Service Committee and the American Civil Liberties Union of Arizona said they would no longer work with him.

Following the 2020 United States presidential election, Blackman supported the "Stop the Steal" movement which falsely claimed that Donald Trump won the election nationally and in Arizona.

In 2022, Blackman said he and his family were the victims of a racist smear campaign driven by the far-right website The Gateway Pundit over his refusal to support overturning the 2020 presidential election. He said that after he gave an interview in which he argued that it would be unconstitutional for state legislators to "decertify" the results of the 2020 presidential election, his daughter received a text message calling him a racial epithet and a  "RINO" (Republican in Name Only).

2022 U.S. House campaign

In March 2021, Blackman announced his candidacy for Arizona's 2nd congressional district in the 2022 elections.

In a September 2021 speech, Blackman said, "The Proud Boys came to one of my events and that was one of the proudest moments of my life." When asked to comment on his remarks, Blackman condemned the Proud Boys, a far-right group that engages in political violence, saying, "At the time of the rally, [I] wasn't familiar with the totality and breadth of the Proud Boys conduct, which I unequivocally condemn."

In a seven-way Republican primary race, Blackman finished second to winner Eli Crane.

Personal life 
Blackman and his wife have five children. His wife works at the Northern Arizona Council of Government.

See also
 List of African-American Republicans

References

External links

Walter Blackman at Arizona State Legislature

1960s births
21st-century American politicians
African-American state legislators in Arizona
Black conservatism in the United States
Candidates in the 2022 United States House of Representatives elections
Critics of Black Lives Matter
Living people
Republican Party members of the Arizona House of Representatives
People from Snowflake, Arizona
United States Army officers
United States Army personnel of the Iraq War